Joe Hill Louis (September 23, 1921 – August 5, 1957), born Lester Hill, was an American singer, guitarist, harmonica player and one-man band. He was one of a small number of one-man blues bands (along with fellow Memphis bluesman Doctor Ross) to have recorded commercially in the 1950s. He was also a session musician for Sun Records.

Life and career

Early life 
Louis was born Lester (or possibly Leslie) Hill on September 23, 1921, in Raines, Tennessee. His nickname "Joe Louis" arose as a result of a childhood fight with another youth. At the age of 14 he left home to work as a servant for a wealthy Memphis family. He also worked at the Peabody Hotel in Memphis in the late 1930s. From the early 1940s onwards he worked as a musician and one-man band.

Recording and radio career
Louis made his recording debut on Columbia Records in 1949, and his music was released on a variety of labels through the 1950s, such as Modern, Checker, Meteor, and Big Town. Louis most notably recording for Sam Phillips' Sun Records, for whom he recorded extensively as a backing musician for a wide variety of other singers as well as under his own name.

His most notable electric blues single, "Boogie in the Park" (recorded in July 1950 and released the following month), featured Louis performing "one of the loudest, most overdriven, and distorted guitar stomps ever recorded" while also playing a rudimentary drum kit. It was the only record released on Sam Phillips's early Phillips label before he founded Sun Records. Louis's electric guitar playing is also considered a predecessor of heavy metal music.

Another notable recording he made at Sun Records was as guitarist on Rufus Thomas's "Bear Cat", an answer record to Big Mama Thornton's "Hound Dog", which reached number 3 on the R&B chart and resulted in legal action for copyright infringement. He also shared writing credit for the song "Tiger Man", which has been recorded by Thomas and Elvis Presley, among others. Around 1950 he took over the Pepticon Boy radio program on WDIA from B. B. King.  He was also known as "The Pepticon Boy" or "The Be-Bop Boy", and recorded as "Chicago Sunny Boy" for Meteor Records in 1953.

Death
Louis died on August 5, 1957, in John Gaston Hospital, in Memphis, at the age of 35, of tetanus contracted as a result of an infected cut on his thumb, sustained while he was working as an odd job man.

References

Bibliography
Harris, S. (1989). Blues Who's Who, 5th paperback edition. New York: Da Capo Press.
Turner, B. (1985). "The Blues in Memphis". Album booklet for Sun Records: The Blues Years 1950–1956. London: Sun Records.

External links
Joe Hill Louis discography
Joe Hill Louis on AllMusic

1921 births
1957 deaths
Memphis blues musicians
American blues harmonica players
American blues singers
American blues guitarists
American male guitarists
African-American guitarists
African-American rock musicians
Musicians from Memphis, Tennessee
Deaths from tetanus
One-man bands
Checker Records artists
Columbia Records artists
Sun Records artists
Modern Records artists
Meteor Records artists
20th-century American guitarists
20th-century African-American male singers